Wallace Harper Burnette (June 20, 1929 – February 12, 2003) was an American professional baseball player who pitched for the Kansas City Athletics from -. He was born in Blairs, Virginia.

In three seasons, he compiled a win–loss record of 14–21, appeared in 68 games, started 27 games, completing 5 games and once pitching a shutout, pitched 262.7 innings, walked 122, struck out 122, gave up 259 hits, and had a career ERA of 3.65. His key pitch was his knuckleball.

Burnette was signed as an amateur free agent by the New York Yankees, but was traded to Kansas City for future Hall of Fame manager Tommy Lasorda on July 11, 1956.

Burnette's daughter said of him:
He thought the salaries [current major leaguers] were drawing were ridiculous. What he made then wasn't even 1 percent of what they're making now. He played for the love of the game.

See also

List of knuckleball pitchers

References

External links

Wally Burnette Obituary at Baseball Almanac

1929 births
2003 deaths
Baseball players from Virginia
Major League Baseball pitchers
Kansas City Athletics players
Denver Bears players
Portland Beavers players
Shreveport Sports players
Binghamton Triplets players
Kansas City Blues (baseball) players
Norfolk Tars players
Knuckleball pitchers
People from Pittsylvania County, Virginia
Easton Yankees players
Blackstone Barristers players